

References

External links 
IMDB listing for German films made in 1941
listing for films made in 1941

Lists of 1941 films by country or language
Lists of German films
film